Kanyama or Kaniama is a territory in the Haut-Lomami province of the Democratic Republic of the Congo.

References 

Territories of Haut-Lomami Province